Jean Gracieux (1575–1634), known as (Nicolas) Deslauriers in comedy and Bruscambille in farce, was a comedian at the Hôtel de Bourgogne theatre in Paris during the early 17th century. He may have given his name to the historical French card game of Brusquembille whose rules are known from the early 18th century.

Life 
Gracieux was born in 1575 in Champagne and died in 1634. He began in farce at the beginning of the 17th century and was renowned for his salacious prologues full of inimitable amphigouri.

His works include:
 Prologues tant sérieux que facétieux (1610) ;
 Fantaisies (1612) ;
 Nouvelles et Plaisantes Imaginations (1613) ;
 Facétieuses Paradoxes (1615) ;
 Bigarures sentencieuses (1622) ;
 Bons Mots. 

These various pieces were compiled in the "Œuvres de Bruscambille" edited in Paris by David Gilles in 1619.

He chose the pseudonym, "Bruscambille" when performing farce, and that of "(Nicolas) Deslauriers" (or "Des Lauriers") for his comedy acts.

Saying 
He was noted for saying "Baste! Comedy is a life without worries and sometimes without six sous."

References

Bibliography

External links 

 .

1575 births
1634 deaths
French male actors
17th-century actors
17th-century French dramatists and playwrights
17th-century French male writers
17th-century pseudonymous writers